Firecracker is a small explosive device primarily designed to produce a large amount of noise.

Firecracker may also refer to:

Media
 Firecrackers. A Realistic Novel (1925), by Carl Van Vechten
 Firecracker (film), a 2005 film starring Mike Patton and Karen Black
 Firecracker, a television ident for BBC Two, first aired in 1993 (see BBC Two '1991–2001' idents)
CLMP Firecracker Award for best independently published literature

Music
 Firecracker (Lisa Loeb album), 1997
 Firecracker (The Wailin' Jennys album), 2006
 Firecracker EP by Unwed Sailor, 1999
 "Firecracker" (Josh Turner song), 2007
 "Firecracker", a song by Mass Production, 1979
 "Firecracker", a song by Ryan Adams from Gold, 2001
 "Firecracker", a song by Yellow Magic Orchestra from Yellow Magic Orchestra, 1978
 "Fire Cracker", a song by 808 State from Quadrastate, 1989

Nature and wildlife
 Firecracker plant, ornamental plants of the genus Russelia
 Firecracker Skimmer (Libellula saturata), a North American species of dragonfly
 Arizona firecracker (Ipomopsis arizonica), a flowering plant native to the mountains of the Mojave Desert

Other uses 
 Pepsi 400, an annual NASCAR race previously known as the Firecracker 400 (1963–1988) and the Firecracker 250 (1959–1962)
Firecracker (software), virtualization software

See also
 Firecracker flower (disambiguation), ornamental plants